Prima-class cruise ships, formerly known by the codename Project Leonardo, are a class of cruise ships built for Norwegian Cruise Line. These are the first NCL ships to be built by Fincantieri. Each ship is expected to cost about $850 million. The modifications that are to be made to the design for the future Prima class ships would result in an extra 1.2 billion euros in shipbuilding costs — about $1.27 billion.

The first ship, the Norwegian Prima, entered service in 2022, with the second, the Norwegian Viva expected in 2023.

The third and fourth Prima-class ships will debut in 2025 and 2026 and will be around 10 percent bigger in gross tonnage than the Norwegian Prima, the first in the NCL’s new class of ships. The fifth and sixth Prima ships will be 20 percent larger, making them the largest in the entire fleet, and they will debut in 2027 and 2028. The ships will be wider and longer than Norwegian Prima and Norwegian Viva.

History 
Norwegian Cruise Line (NCL) ordered four ships in February 2017, with an option for two more ships, under the codename "Project Leonardo".
The ships should be delivered in the years 2022 to 2025, the optional ships up to 2027.

In July 2018, the cruise line confirmed its order for the fifth and sixth cruise ships under Project Leonardo. They are expected to join the NCL's fleet in 2026 and 2027 respectively.

Design
The ships will measure 140,000 gross tonnage (gt) and accommodate approximately 3,300 guests.

In 2022, Norwegian Cruise Line announced that the third to sixth vessels would have a higher passenger capacity of 3,550 guests.

Ships

References

Project Leonardo
Ships of Norwegian Cruise Line
Fincantieri